Aleuritin is a coumarinolignoid found in the tree Aleurites fordii.

References 

Coumarinolignoids
O-methylated natural phenols